SIRIM Berhad, formerly known as the Standard and Industrial Research Institute of Malaysia (SIRIM), is a corporate organisation owned wholly by the Malaysian Government, under the Minister of Finance Incorporated. It has been entrusted by the Malaysian Government to be the national organisation for standards and quality, and as a promoter of technological excellence in the Malaysian industry. The main headquarters is located in Shah Alam, Selangor.

The organization came into operation on 1 September 1996 via corporatisation scheme of standards and industrial research institute.

Subsidiaries
 SIRIM QAS International Sdn. Bhd
 SIRIM STS Sdn. Bhd. 
 SIRIM Standards Technology Sdn. Bhd.
 National Precision Tooling Sdn. Bhd.
 SIRIM Tech Venture Sdn. Bhd.

Functions
To promote and undertake scientific industrial research 
To boost industrial efficiency and development 
To provide technology transfer and consultancy services 
To develop Malaysian standards and to promote standardization and quality assurance for greater competitiveness 
To enhance public and industrial welfare, health and safety

Pre-SIRIM Berhad history

In 1964, the Government of Malaysia directed the Minister of Commerce and Industry to make a study of the establishment of a national standards organization. This is in response to the urgent necessity of adopting the principles of standardization in light of Malaysia's accelerating industrial development.

As a result, the Standards Institution of Malaysia (SIM) was initially established as a Government department under the Ministry of Commerce and Industry in early 1966. In October 1966, the Standards Act No: 76, 1966 was passed in Parliament making SIM the national standards body. SIM was governed by the Standards Council. The Standards Act provides the Standards Council with independent authority for the declaration of standards and the issuance of certification mark licences.

In 1974, the National Action Council decided that SIM be merged with the National Institute for Scientific and Industrial Research (NISIR) to form the Standards and Industrial Research Institute of Malaysia (SIRIM). As a result of this decision, SIRIM was established as a statutory body under the Ministry of Science, Technology and the Environment by the SIRIM (Incorporation) Act, 1975 which came into effect on 15 September 1975. With this merger, SIRIM is better equipped to expand its scope of operations in line with the rapid advancement of industrialization in Malaysia.

In view of rapidly changing market needs as a result of the accelerating national industrialization and globalization of markets, there was a need to amend the SIRIM (Incorporation) Act 1975. This will provide necessary flexibility for SIRIM to respond to these changes.

The Amendments to the SIRIM (Incorporation) Act, approved by Parliament, came into effect on 24 July 1993.

The Amendments allow SIRIM to undertake commercial operations through the formation of joint-venture or wholly owned subsidiaries. Under this Amendment, the 24-member SIRIM Council was replaced by a 13-member SIRIM of which six were from the public sector and seven from the private sector. The new SIRIM Board structure enables greater accountability and efficiency, and further strengthen the linkages between SIRIM and the industry.

On 1 September 1996, SIRIM was corporatised to be known as SIRIM Berhad. SIRIM Berhad was incorporated under the Companies Act, vested with all the rights, privileges and obligations of SIRIM.

See also
 Science and technology in Malaysia

External links

 Official SIRIM Berhad website
 Official SIRIM Standards Technology website - SST (Calibration & Measurement)
 Official SIRIM QAS International website (Testing & Certification)
 Official SIRIM STS website (Training & Standards Development)

Government-owned companies of Malaysia
Research institutes in Malaysia
1996 establishments in Malaysia
Research institutes established in 1996
Companies established in 1996
Science and technology in Malaysia
Ministry of Energy, Technology, Science, Climate Change and Environment (Malaysia)
Malaysian brands
Minister of Finance (Incorporated) (Malaysia)
Privately held companies of Malaysia